The 8th Signal Regiment is a signal unit in the French Army. It is a part of the Signal Brigade.

History
After the defeat of the French Army in 1940 many regiments were disbanded, including the 8th Engineer Regiment (many of whose personnel entered the French Resistance). The number “8” reappears on 1 April 1946 at Fort Mont-Valérien with the formation of the 8th Signal Battalion. Exactly a year later, 1 April 1947, the battalion is transformed into the 8th Signal Regiment, inheriting the honors and traditions of the 24th Telegraph Sapper Battalion and 8th Engineer Regiment.

Honors

Battle Honors
Maroc 1907-1913
Flandres 1915
Verdun 1916
La Somme 1916
La Malmaison 1917
Resistance 1940-1944

Decorations
Croix de Guerre 1939-1945 with one palm.

References

20th-century regiments of France
French engineer regiments
Military units and formations established in 1907
Military units and formations disestablished in 1944